Michael Coleman (born 1962 in Abbeyknockmoy, County Galway) is an Irish former hurler. He played for his local club Abbeyknockmoy and was a member of the Galway senior inter-county team from 1988 until 1999.

References

1962 births
Living people
Galway inter-county hurlers
Connacht inter-provincial hurlers
All-Ireland Senior Hurling Championship winners
Abbeyknockmoy hurlers